The Hodge-Cook House is a historic house at 620 North Maple Street in North Little Rock, Arkansas.  It is a -story wood-frame structure, with clapboard siding and a hip roof pierced by hip-roof dormers on each side.  A gable-roof section projects from the right side of the front, with a three-part sash window and a half-round window in the gable.  A porch extends across the rest of the front, supported by tapered Craftsman-style fluted square columns.  The house was built c. 1898 by John Hodge, a local businessman, and is one of the city's finest examples of vernacular Colonial Revival architecture.

The house was listed on the National Register of Historic Places in 1993.

See also
National Register of Historic Places listings in Pulaski County, Arkansas

References

Houses on the National Register of Historic Places in Arkansas
Colonial Revival architecture in Arkansas
Houses completed in 1898
Houses in North Little Rock, Arkansas
National Register of Historic Places in Pulaski County, Arkansas